Magüí Payán is a town and municipality in the Nariño Department, Colombia.

Climate
Magüí Payán has a tropical rainforest climate (Köppen Af) with very heavy rainfall year round.

Notable people
 

Josimar Quiñonez (born 1987), footballer

References

Municipalities of Nariño Department